General Osman Omar Wehliye "Gas-Gas" is a Somali military commander.

Career
From March 2011 to October 2014, Wehliye served as the Commissioner of the Somali Police Force.

On 30 October 2014, he was appointed Interim Police Chief by Prime Minister Abdiweli Sheikh Ahmed, following the sudden death of former Police Chief Mohamed Sheikh Ismail. Wehliye's term as Police Commissioner ended on 30 April 2015, when Prime Minister Omar Abdirashid Ali Sharmarke appointed Mohamed Sheikh Hassan as the permanent Chief of Police.

References

Year of birth missing (living people)
Living people
Somalian police chiefs